Atomic: The Very Best of Blondie is a greatest hits album by American rock band Blondie, released on July 13, 1998, by Chrysalis Records, at the time when the band reunited and shortly before the beginning of their successful comeback tour.

Overview
Atomic: The Very Best of Blondie includes the band's best known songs from the 1970s and 1980s, as well as two new remixes of the title track. The compilation reached number 12 on the UK Albums Chart and has been certified platinum by the British Phonographic Industry (BPI).

The compilation was reissued in June 1999 as a limited-edition two-CD set titled Atomic/Atomix: The Very Best of Blondie, including a second disc of previously available remixes with the exception of another new remix of the title track.

On October 31, 2011, the compilation was reissued again as a single disc with identical track listing, but with the title being changed to Essential, which was certified gold by the BPI on September 21, 2018.

Track listing
Disc one – Atomic: The Very Best of Blondie
 "Atomic" (7″ Mix) (Destri, Harry) – 3:50
 "Heart of Glass" (7″ Mix) (Harry, Stein) – 4:11
 "Sunday Girl" (Stein) – 3:15
 "Call Me" (Harry, Moroder) – 3:32
 "The Tide Is High" (7″ Edit) (Barrett, Evans, Holt) – 3:52
 "Denis" (Levenson) – 2:18
 "Dreaming" (Harry, Stein) – 3:06
 "Rapture" (7″ Mix) (Harry, Stein) – 4:59
 "Hanging on the Telephone" (Lee) – 2:22
 "(I'm Always Touched by Your) Presence, Dear" (Valentine) – 2:42
 "Island of Lost Souls" (7″ Edit) (Harry, Stein) - 3:50
 "Picture This" (Destri, Harry, Stein) – 2:57
 "Union City Blue" (Harrison, Harry) – 3:22
 "War Child" (Harrison, Harry) - 4:00
 "Rip Her to Shreds" (Harry, Stein) – 3:21
 "One Way or Another" (Harrison, Harry) - 3:28
 "X Offender (Harry, Valentine) - 3:10
 "I'm Gonna Love You Too" (Mauldin, Petty, Sullivan) - 2:07
 "Fade Away and Radiate" (Stein) - 3:59
 "Atomic '98" (Xenomania Mix)" (Destri, Harry) - 4:33
 "Atomic '98" (Tall Paul Mix)"  (Destri, Harry) - 8:43

Disc two – Atomix: The Very Best of Blondie Remixed
 "Atomic" (Diddy's 12″ Mix) – 6:51
 From the compilation Beautiful: The Remix Album (1995)
 "Dreaming" (Utah Saints Mix) – 6:21
 From the compilation Beautiful: The Remix Album (1995)
 "Denis" (Danny D Remix) – 5:23
 From the compilation Once More into the Bleach (1988)
 "Call Me" (Original 12″ Version) – 8:04
 From the American Gigolo soundtrack (1980)
 "Heart of Glass" (Original 12″ Instrumental) – 5:14
 From the UK & US "Heart of Glass" 12″ single (1979)
 "Rapture" (US Disco Version) – 7:13
 From the US "Rapture" 12″ single (1981)
 "War Child" (12″ Version) - 8:01
 From the UK "War Child" 12″ single (1982)
 "Atomic '98" (Dana Intellectual Mix) / "Sunday Girl" (French Version) (Hidden track) – 10:50

Tracks 4, 5, 6 and 8 were previously unreleased on CD.

Charts

Weekly charts

Year-end charts

Certifications

References

1998 greatest hits albums
Albums produced by Giorgio Moroder
Albums produced by Mike Chapman
Albums produced by Richard Gottehrer
Blondie (band) compilation albums
1998 remix albums
Chrysalis Records compilation albums
EMI Records remix albums
EMI Records compilation albums
Chrysalis Records remix albums